The Likely Rancheria is a federal Indian reservation belonging to the Pit River Tribe, a federally recognized tribe of indigenous people of California. The ranchería is located in Modoc County in northern California.<ref name=sdsu>"Likely Rancheria." SDSU: California Indians and their Reservations." Retrieved 10 Feb 2020.</ref>

Likely Rancheria is  large. It was purchased by the Pit River Tribe in 1922 and serves as their tribal cemetery. It has the distinction of being the smallest Indian reservation in the United States.

Education
The ranchería is served by the Modoc Joint Unified School District.

References

 Pritzker, Barry M. A Native American Encyclopedia: History, Culture, and Peoples.'' Oxford: Oxford University Press, 2000. .

External links
 Pit River Tribe, official website
 Photo of Old Pete, Likely Rancheria, 1925

Pit River tribes
Modoc County, California
American Indian reservations in California
Native American tribes in California
Federally recognized tribes in the United States